The Politics of Chad take place in a framework of a presidential republic, whereby the President of Chad is both head of state and head of government. Executive power is exercised by the government. Legislative power is vested in both the government and parliament. Chad is one of the most corrupt countries in the world.

In May 2013, security forces in Chad foiled a coup against the President Idriss Deby that had been in preparation for several months. In April 2021, President Déby was injured by the rebel group Front Pour l'Alternance et La Concorde au Tchad (FACT). He succumbed to his injuries on April 20, 2021. His presidency was taken by his family member Mahamat Déby in April of 2021. This resulted in both the National Assembly and Chadian Government being dissolved and replaced with a Transitional Military Council.

Executive branch

|President
|Mahamat Déby
|Patriotic Salvation Movement
|20 April 2021
|}

Chad's executive branch is headed by the President and dominates the Chadian political system. Following the military overthrow of Hissène Habré in December 1990, Idriss Déby won the presidential elections in 1996 and 2001. The constitutional basis for the government is the 1996 constitution, under which the president was limited to two terms of office until Déby had that provision repealed in 2005. The president has the power to appoint the Council of State (or cabinet), and exercises considerable influence over appointments of judges, generals, provincial officials and heads of Chad's parastatal firms. In cases of grave and immediate threat, the president, in consultation with the National Assembly President and Council of State, may declare a state of emergency. Most of the key advisors for former president Déby were members of the Zaghawa clan, although some southern and opposition personalities were represented in his government.

Legislative branch
According to the 1996 constitution, the National Assembly deputies are elected by universal suffrage for 4-year terms. The Assembly holds regular sessions twice a year, starting in March and October, and can hold special sessions as necessary and called by the prime minister. Deputies elect a president of the National Assembly every 2 years. Assembly deputies or members of the executive branch may introduce legislation; once passed by the Assembly, the president must take action to either sign or reject the law within 15 days. The National Assembly must approve the prime minister's plan of government and may force the prime minister to resign through a majority vote of no-confidence. However, if the National Assembly rejects the executive branch's program twice in one year, the president may disband the Assembly and call for new legislative elections. In practice, the president exercises considerable influence over the National Assembly through the MPS party structure.

Judicial branch
Despite the constitution's guarantee of judicial independence from the executive branch, the president names most key judicial officials. The Supreme Court is made up of a chief justice, named by the president, and 15 councilors chosen by the president and National Assembly; appointments are for life. The Constitutional Council, with nine judges elected to 9-year terms, has the power to review all legislation, treaties and international agreements prior to their adoption. The constitution recognizes customary and traditional law in locales where it is recognized and to the extent it does not interfere with public order or constitutional guarantees of equality for all citizens.

Political parties and elections

Presidential elections

Parliamentary elections

International organization participation
ACCT, 
ACP, 
AfDB, 
AU, 
BDEAC, 
CEMAC, 
FAO, 
FZ, 
G-77, 
IBRD, 
ICAO, 
ICCt, 
ICFTU, 
ICRM, 
IDA, 
IDB, 
IFAD, 
IFC, 
IFRCS, 
ILO, 
IMF, 
Interpol, 
IOC, 
ITU, 
MIGA, 
NAM, 
OIC, 
ONUB, 
OPCW, 
UN, 
UNCTAD, 
UNESCO, 
UNIDO, 
UNOCI, 
UPU, 
WCL, 
WHO, 
WIPO, 
WMO, 
WToO, 
WTrO

2021 government shakeup

On 20 April 2021, following the death of longtime Chad President Idriss Déby, the Military of Chad released a statement confirming that both the Government of Chad and the nation's National Assembly had been dissolved and that a Transitional Military Council led by Déby's son Mahamat would lead the nation for at least 18 months.

Following protests on 14 May 2022, the authorities in Chad detained several members of civil society organizations. The protests were organized in N’Djamena, and other cities across the country by Chadian civil society organizations, united under the coalition Wakit Tamma.

References

 

pt:Chade#Política